The Want is an American rock band from Washington, D.C.

History
The Want formed in Washington D.C. in the early 1990s  and began playing live shows in 1994. The Washington Post describes their music as “musically tough” with “satiric lyrical twists that are pretty dang funny on closer inspection.”  Allmusic writer Steve Huey describes The Want as “influenced primarily by rockabilly-tinged L.A. punk bands like X and Social Distortion.”  Washington City Paper music and film critic Mark Jenkins described The Want as “skillfully eclectic outfit.” 

In April 1995 The Want released their first CD, "Too Much Stuff," on Selling the Ranch Records followed by "Texas" in 1998. The current lineup of The Want is guitarist Bob Stewart, bassist Jack Stanton, and drummer Damian Banaszak.

Line-up
 Damian Banaszak - drums & vocals
 Jack Stanton - bass guitar & vocals
 Bob Stewart - guitar & vocals

Discography

Albums
 Too Much Stuff (1995, The Orchard)
 Texas (1998, The Orchard)

Singles
 If It Weren't for Girls, There Would Be No Christmas (2011), Selling the Ranch Records

Compilation appearances
 "Plunge - Local Music Store Compilation Volume IV" featured The Want's single "Lifetime Exposure"

References

External links
The Want Official Site
The Want at MySpace

Rock music groups from Washington, D.C.
American psychobilly musical groups
American musical trios